Balak Aur Janwar is a 1975 Bollywood film directed by Nanabhai Bhatt.

Cast
 Randhawa
Mohan Choti   
Dulari   
Alankar Joshi   
Kanan Kaushal   
Baldev Khosa   
Usha Solanki

Soundtrack 
All songs were written by Bharat Vyas and composed by Chitragupt. 

"Chahe Jal Jal Mare Sari Duniya" - Mohammed Rafi 
"Aao Hilmil Pyaar Se Khele" - Lata Mangeshkar
"Om Nama Shivay" - Mahendra Kapoor
"Balak Hu Par Badi Baat Kehta Hu" - Lata Mangeshkar
"Aa Ja Sanam Chod Sharam" - Asha Bhosle
"Balak Hai Bhola Bhala" - Mahendra Kapoor

External links
 

1975 films
1970s Hindi-language films